The Blinnenhorn (German) or Corno Cieco (Italian) is a mountain in the Lepontine Alps, located on the border between Italy and Switzerland. On the north-east side lies the Gries Glacier.

See also
List of mountains of Valais
List of most isolated mountains of Switzerland

References

External links
Blinnenhorn on Hikr

Mountains of the Alps
Alpine three-thousanders
Mountains of Switzerland
Mountains of Valais
Lepontine Alps
Italy–Switzerland border